This is a list of high schools in the state of Louisiana.

Acadia Parish

Church Point High School, Church Point
Iota High School, Iota
Midland High School, Midland
Rayne High School, Rayne

Crowley

Crowley High School
Northside Christian School
Notre Dame High School

Allen Parish

Elizabeth High School, Elizabeth
Fairview High School, Grant
Kinder High School, Kinder
Oakdale High School, Oakdale
Oberlin High School, Oberlin
Reeves High School, Reeves

Ascension Parish
Dutchtown High School, Geismar
St. Amant High School, St. Amant

Donaldsonville
Ascension Catholic High School
Donaldsonville High School

Gonzales
Ascension Christian High School
East Ascension High School

Assumption Parish
Assumption High School, Napoleonville

Avoyelles Parish

Avoyelles High School, Moreauville
Avoyelles Public Charter School, Mansura
Bunkie High School, Bunkie
Marksville High School, Marksville
St. Joseph School, Plaucheville

Beauregard Parish

DeRidder High School, DeRidder
East Beauregard High School, Dry Creek
Merryville High School, Merryville
Singer High School, Singer
South Beauregard High School, Longville

Bienville Parish
Arcadia High School, Arcadia
Castor High School, Castor
Gibsland-Coleman Complex, Gibsland
Ringgold High School, Ringgold
Saline High School, Saline

Bossier Parish

Benton High School, Benton
Haughton High School, Haughton
Plain Dealing High School, Plain Dealing

Bossier City

Airline High School
Bossier High School
Parkway High School

Caddo Parish
North Caddo High School, Vivian

Shreveport

Public

Booker T. Washington High School
C. E. Byrd High School
Caddo Career & Technology Center
Caddo Magnet High School
Captain Shreve High School
Green Oaks High School
Huntington High School
Northwood High School
Southwood High School
Woodlawn High School

Private/Charter

Calvary Baptist Academy
Evangel Christian Academy
Kingston Christian Academy
Loyola College Prep
Magnolia School of Excellence
Pathways in Education (Southern Hills & North Market)
Word of God Academy

Calcasieu Parish

Bell City High School, Bell City
DeQuincy High School, DeQuincy
Iowa High School, Iowa
Starks High School, Starks
Vinton High School, Vinton
Westlake High School, Westlake

Lake Charles

A. M. Barbe High School
Calcasieu Career Center
Hamilton Christian School
LaGrange High School
Lake Charles College Prep
Lake Charles-Boston Academy of Learning
Sam Houston High School
St. Louis Catholic High School
Washington-Marion Magnet High School

Sulphur

Parkview Christian School
Sulphur High School

Caldwell Parish
Caldwell Parish High School, Columbia

Cameron Parish
Grand Lake High School, Grand Lake
Hackberry High School, Hackberry
Johnson Bayou High School, Johnson Bayou
South Cameron High School, Creole

Catahoula Parish

Harrisonburg High School, Harrisonburg
Sicily Island High School, Sicily Island

Jonesville

Block High School
Central High School

Claiborne Parish
Haynesville Junior/Senior High School, Haynesvile
Homer High School, Homer
Summerfield High School, Summerfield

Concordia Parish

Concordia Parish Academy of Math, Science & Technology Ridgecrest
Monterey High School, Monterey
Vidalia High School, Vidalia

Ferriday

Delta Charter School
Ferriday High School

De Soto Parish

Mansfield High School, Mansfield
North DeSoto High School, Stonewall

Logansport

Logansport High School
Stanley High School

East Baton Rouge Parish

Baker High School, Baker
Northeast High School, Pride
Zachary High School, Zachary

Baton Rouge

Public

Baton Rouge Magnet High School
Belaire High School
Broadmoor High School
Capitol High School
East Baton Rouge Laboratory Academy
Glen Oaks High School
Istrouma High School
Liberty Magnet High School
Louisiana School for the Deaf
Louisiana School for the Visually Impaired
McKinley High School
Northdale Alternative Magnet Academy
Scotlandville Magnet High School
Tara High School
Woodlawn High School

Private

The Brighton School
Catholic High School
Collegiate Baton Rouge
Cristo Rey Baton Rouge Franciscan High School
The Dunham School
Episcopal High School
Family Christian Academy
Greater Baton Rouge Hope Academy
Jehovah-Jireh Christian Academy
Madison Preparatory Academy
Mentorship Academy of Digital Arts
Parkview Baptist High School
St Joseph's Academy
Southern University Laboratory School
St. Michael the Archangel High School
Thrive Academy
University Lab High School

Central

Central High School
Central Private School

East Carroll Parish

Lake Providence

Briarfield Academy
General Trass High School

East Feliciana Parish

East Feliciana High School, Jackson
Silliman Institute, Clinton
Slaughter Community Charter School, Slaughter

Evangeline Parish

Basile High School, Basile
Mamou High School, Mamou
Pine Prairie High School, Pine Prairie

Ville Platte

Sacred Heart High School
Ville Platte High School

Franklin Parish

Winnsboro

Family Community Christian School
Franklin Academy
Franklin Parish High School

Grant Parish

Georgetown High School, Georgetown
Montgomery High School, Montgomery

Dry Prong

Grant Academy
Grant High School

Iberia Parish

Delcambre High School, Delcambre
Jeanerette Senior High School, Jeanerette
Loreauville High School, Loreauville

New Iberia

Catholic High School
Highland Baptist Christian School
New Iberia Senior High School
Westgate High School

Iberville Parish
White Castle High School, White Castle

Plaquemine

Mathematics, Science, and Arts Academy - West
Plaquemine Senior High School
St. John High School

St. Gabriel

East Iberville High School
Mathematics, Science, and Arts Academy - East

Jackson Parish

Jonesboro-Hodge High School, Jonesboro
Quitman High School, Quitman
Weston High School, Weston

Jefferson Parish

Fisher Middle-High School, Jean Lafitte
Grand Isle School, Grand Isle
JCFA West Campus, Terrytown
John Curtis Christian High School, River Ridge

Gretna

A Different World Academy
Thomas Jefferson High School
Muslim Academy

Harvey

Helen Cox High School
JCFA Main Campus
West Jefferson High School

Jefferson

JCFA East Campus
Patrick F. Taylor Science and Technology Academy
Riverdale High School

Kenner

Alfred Bonnabel High School
Kenner Discovery Health Sciences Academy

Marrero

Academy of Our Lady
Archbishop Shaw High School
Cuillier Career Center
John Ehret High School
L. W. Higgins High School

Metairie

Archbishop Chapelle High School
Archbishop Rummel High School
Crescent City Christian School
East Jefferson High School
Ecole Classique School
Grace King High School
Haynes Academy for Advanced Studies
Holy Rosary High School
Lutheran High School of Greater New Orleans
Metairie Park Country Day School
Ridgewood Preparatory School
St. Martin's Episcopal School

Jefferson Davis Parish

Elton High School, Elton
Hathaway High School, Hathaway
Lacassine High School, Lacassine
Lake Arthur High School, Lake Arthur
Welsh High School, Welsh

Jennings

Bethel Christian School
Jennings High School

La Salle Parish

Jena High School, Jena
La Salle High School, Olla

Lafayette Parish
Southside High School, Youngsville

Lafayette

Acadiana High School
Ascension Episcopal School
Carencro High School
David Thibodaux STEM Magnet Academy
Lafayette Christian Academy
Lafayette Renaissance Charter High School
Lafayette High School
Northside High School
Ovey Comeaux High School
St. Thomas More Catholic High School
Teurlings Catholic High School

Lafourche Parish

Central Lafourche High School, Raceland
South Lafourche High School, Galliano

Thibodaux

Edward Douglas White Catholic High School
Thibodaux High School

Lincoln Parish

Choudrant High School, Choudrant
Dubach High School, Dubach
Lincoln Preparatory School, Grambling
Simsboro High School, Simsboro

Ruston

Bethel Christian School
Cedar Creek School
Ruston High School

Livingston Parish

Albany High School, Albany
Denham Springs High School, Denham Springs
Doyle High School, Livingston
French Settlement High School, French Settlement
Holden High School, Holden
Live Oak High School, Watson
Maurepas High School, Maurepas
Springfield High School, Springfield

Walker

Livingston Parish Literacy & Technology Center
Walker High School

Madison Parish

Tallulah

Madison High School
Tallulah Academy/Delta Christian School

Morehouse Parish

Bastrop

Bastrop High School
Beekman Charter School
Prairie View Academy

Natchitoches Parish
Lakeview High School, Campti

Natchitoches

Louisiana School for Math, Science, and the Arts
Natchitoches Central High School
Natchitoches Parish Career & Technical Center
St. Mary's High School

Orleans Parish (New Orleans)

Public Charter

Benjamin Franklin High School
Cohen College Prep High School
Collegiate Academies (Abramson Sci Academy, Collegiate Baton Rouge, G. W. Carver, Livingston, Opportunities, Rosenwald)
Delores Taylor Arthur School for Young Men
Dr. King Charter School
Edna Karr High School
Eleanor McMain Secondary School
International High School of New Orleans
KIPP New Orleans Schools (Booker T. Washington, Frederick A. Douglass, John F. Kennedy)
McDonogh 35 High School
Landry-Walker College and Career Preparatory High School
Living School
Lusher Charter School
Lycée Français de la Nouvelle-Orléans
Morris Jeff Community School
The NET Charter High Schools (Central City, Gentilly, East)
New Harmony High School
New Orleans Center for Creative Arts (NOCCA)
New Orleans Charter Science and Mathematics High School
New Orleans Military & Maritime Academy
Rooted School
Sophie B. Wright Charter School
Warren Easton High School

Private

Academy of the Sacred Heart
Brother Martin High School
Cabrini High School
De La Salle High School
Holy Cross High School
Holy Rosary High School
Isidore Newman School
Jesuit High School
Life of Christ Christian Academy
Light City Christian Academy
McGehee School
Mount Carmel Academy
St. Augustine High School
St. Katharine Drexel Preparatory School
St. Mary's Academy
St. Mary's Dominican High School
Ursuline Academy

Ouachita Parish

Monroe

Carroll High School
Neville High School
New Vision Learning Academy
Ouachita Christian High School
Ouachita Parish High School
Richwood High School
River Oaks High School
St. Frederick High School
Sterlington High School
Wossman High School

West Monroe

Claiborne Christian School
West Monroe High School
West Ouachita High School

Plaquemines Parish

Belle Chasse High School, Belle Chasse
South Plaquemines High School, Port Sulphur
Phoenix High School, Braithwaite

Pointe Coupee Parish
Livonia High School, Livonia

New Roads

Catholic High School of Pointe Coupee
False River Academy

Rapides Parish

Buckeye High School, Deville
Northwood High School, Lena
Oak Hill High School, Hineston
Pineville High School, Pineville
Rapides High School, Lecompte
Tioga High School, Tioga

Alexandria

Alexandria Country Day School
Alexandria Senior High School
Bolton High School
Grace Christian School
Holy Savior Menard Central High School
Peabody Magnet High School

Glenmora

Glenmora High School
Plainview High School

Red River Parish

Coushatta

Red River Senior High School
Riverdale Academy

Richland Parish
Mangham High School, Mangham

Delhi

Delhi Charter School
Delhi High School

Rayville

Rayville High School
Riverfield Academy

Sabine Parish

Converse High School, Converse
Ebarb School, Ebarb
Florien High School, Florien
Many High School, Many
Negreet High School, Negreet
Pleasant Hill High School, Pleasant Hill
Zwolle High School, Zwolle

St. Bernard Parish
Chalmette High School, Chalmette

St. Charles Parish
Destrehan High School, Destrehan
Hahnville High School, Boutte

St. Helena Parish
St. Helena Central High School, Greensburg

St. James Parish
Lutcher High School, Lutcher
St. James High School, St. James

St. John the Baptist Parish

East St. John High School, Reserve
West St. John High School, Edgard
Riverside Academy, Reserve
St. Charles Catholic High School, Laplace

St. Landry Parish

Academy of the Sacred Heart, Grand Coteau
Beau Chene High School, Arnaudville
North Central High School, Lebeau
Port Barre High School, Port Barre

Eunice

Eunice High School
St. Edmund High School

Opelousas

J. S. Clark Leadership Academy
Magnet Academy for Cultural Arts
Northwest High School
Opelousas Catholic School
Opelousas Senior High School
Westminster Christian Academy

St. Martin Parish

Breaux Bridge High School, Breaux Bridge
Cecilia High School, Cecilia
Episcopal School of Acadiana, Cade
St. Martinville Senior High School, St. Martinville

St. Mary Parish

Berwick High School, Berwick
Centerville High School, Centerville
Patterson High School, Patterson
West St. Mary High School, Baldwin

Franklin

Franklin Senior High School
Hanson Memorial High School

Morgan City

Central Catholic High School
Morgan City High School

St. Tammany Parish
Pearl River High School, Pearl River

Covington

Archbishop Hannan High School
Christ Episcopal School
Covington High School
Northlake Christian School
St. Paul's School
St. Scholastica Academy

Mandeville

Fontainebleau High School
Lakeshore High School
Mandeville High School

Slidell

First Baptist Christian School
Northshore High School
Pope John Paul II High School
Salmen High School
Slidell High School

Tangipahoa Parish

Amite High School, Amite
Independence High School, Independence
Loranger High School, Loranger
Ponchatoula High School, Ponchatoula

Hammond

Hammond High School
St. Thomas Aquinas High School

Kentwood

Jewel Sumner High School
Kentwood High School

Tensas Parish

St. Joseph

Tensas Academy
Tensas High School

Terrebonne Parish

H. L. Bourgeois High School, Gray
South Terrebonne High School, Bourg

Houma

Covenant Christian Academy
Houma Christian School
Ellender Memorial High School
Terrebonne High School
Vandebilt Catholic High School

Union Parish
Downsville High School, Downsville

Farmerville

D'Arbonne Woods Charter School
Union Parish High School

Vermilion Parish

Erath High School, Erath
Gueydan High School, Gueydan
Kaplan High School, Kaplan
North Vermilion High School, Maurice

Abbeville

Abbeville High School
Harvest Time Christian Academy
Vermilion Catholic High School

Vernon Parish

Anacoco High School, Anacoco
Evans High School, Evans
Hornbeck High School, Hornbeck
Pitkin High School, Pitkin
Rosepine High School, Rosepine
Simpson High School, Simpson

Leesville

Faith Training Christian Academy
Hicks High School
Leesville High School
Pickering High School

Washington Parish

Bogalusa High School, Bogalusa
Mount Hermon High School, Mount Hermon
Varnado High School, Varnado

Franklinton

Franklinton High School
Pine Junior/Senior High School

Webster Parish

Doyline High School, Doyline
Lakeside High School, Sibley
North Webster High School, Springhill

Minden

Glenbrook School
Minden High School

West Baton Rouge Parish

Brusly High School, Brusly
Port Allen High School, Port Allen
The Christian Academy of Louisiana, Addis

West Carroll Parish

Epps High School, Epps
Forest High School, Forest
Kilbourne High School, Kilbourne
Oak Grove High School, Oak Grove

West Feliciana Parish
West Feliciana High School, St. Francisville

Winn Parish

Atlanta High School, Atlanta
Calvin High School, Calvin
Dodson High School, Dodson
Winnfield Senior High School, Winnfield

See also 
List of school districts in Louisiana
List of former high schools in Louisiana
List of former high schools in New Orleans

Louisiana
High Schools